Disperato is a 1990 song composed by Marco Masini, Giancarlo Bigazzi and Giuseppe Dati and recorded by Marco Masini.  The song won the newcomer section as well as the critics award at the 40th edition of the Sanremo Music Festival. 
 
The song has been described as "a portrait of the discomfort and the complexity of teenage angst."

Track listing

   7" single – SRL 11101 
 "Disperato"  (Marco Masini, Giancarlo Bigazzi, Giuseppe Dati)
 "Meglio solo" (Marco Masini, Giancarlo Bigazzi, Giuseppe Dati)

Charts

Year-end charts

References

 

1990 singles
Italian songs
1990 songs
Sanremo Music Festival songs
Songs written by Giancarlo Bigazzi